Houston Beauty is an American reality television series that airs on the Oprah Winfrey Network and premiered on November 2, 2013. It chronicles the lives of Glenda "Ms. J" Jemison, the owner and director of Franklin Beauty School, and also encompasses some of the hardships the students face outside of the classroom plus the drama that occurs between them. Franklin Beauty School is the oldest continuously operated licensed beauty school in Texas.

Cast

 Glenda "Ms. J" Jemison
 Ms. Eley
 Ms. Burns
 Mia Ryan
 Neil Cain
 Queensley Felix
 Corey Ford
 Grace
 Jessica
 Blair
 Shamika
 Mia C

Episodes

References

External links
 
 

2010s American reality television series
2013 American television series debuts
English-language television shows
Oprah Winfrey Network original programming
2013 American television series endings